The Oracle of Delphi is a Big Finish Productions audio drama featuring Lisa Bowerman as Bernice Summerfield, a character from the spin-off media based on the long-running British science fiction television series Doctor Who.

Plot
Arriving in Athens in 430BCE, Bernice and Jason soon find themselves encountering a mysterious cult, the war with the Spartans, a threat to all of time and a man called Socrates.

Cast
Bernice Summerfield - Lisa Bowerman
Jason Kane - Stephen Fewell
Socrates - Paul Shelley
Megaira - Brigid Zengeni
Plato - Scott Handcock
Athenian Woman - Sharon Gosling
Athenian Woman - Amanda Lindsay

External links
Big Finish Productions - Professor Bernice Summerfield: The Oracle of Delphi 

Bernice Summerfield audio plays
Works by Scott Handcock
Fiction set in the 27th century
Ancient Greece in fiction